Paradise Dam may refer to:

 Paradise Dam (Queensland), a dam in Australia
 Paradise Dam (Montana), an unbuilt dam project in Montana, USA